Matteo Bobbi (born 2 July 1978 in Milan) is an Italian racing driver with experience in several motor sport categories, including three years as a Minardi test driver in Formula One.

During a brief time with Formula One's Minardi as their test driver, he also began racing in sports cars, winning the 2003 FIA GT Championship with Thomas Biagi in a BMS Scuderia Italia Ferrari, and finishing as runner-up in 2004.  In 2006, he won the GT2 class with Jaime Melo.

Bobbi began racing karts in 1995 and progressed to Formula Renault in 1998, where he finished on the podium several times. He tested a Formula One car for Minardi in 2000, and became their official test driver the following year. Also that year, he competed in the Spanish Formula Nissan Championship, in which he won at Valencia.  He won six races in 2002, finishing as runner-up in the championship standings.

Bobbi continued to work with Minardi until mid-2003, including a Grand Prix weekend test session at the 2003 San Marino Grand Prix. Giovanni Minardi was his manager at the time. He also competed in the Rolex Sports Car Series for Cheever Racing.

Racing results

Complete Formula One participations
(key)

24 Hours of Le Mans results

Complete GT1 World Championship results

References

External links
Official website

1978 births
Living people
FIA GT Championship drivers
Rolex Sports Car Series drivers
Racing drivers from Milan
24 Hours of Daytona drivers
American Le Mans Series drivers
European Le Mans Series drivers
FIA GT1 World Championship drivers
Porsche Supercup drivers
British GT Championship drivers
Blancpain Endurance Series drivers
International GT Open drivers
24 Hours of Spa drivers

SMP Racing drivers
Cheever Racing drivers
AF Corse drivers
Lamborghini Super Trofeo drivers